Statistics of the Scottish Football League in season 2012–13.

Scottish First Division

Scottish Second Division

Scottish Third Division

See also
2012–13 in Scottish football

References

 
Scottish Football League seasons